Enemion stipitatum (syn. Isopyrum stipitatum) is a species of flowering plant in the buttercup family known by the common name Siskiyou false rue anemone. It is native to northern California and southern Oregon where it grows in forest, woodland, and chaparral habitats in the local mountain ranges. This is a petite perennial herb producing one or more erect, unbranched stems to a maximum height no more than 15 centimeters. Leaves appear toward the top of each stem in arrays of several cloverlike leaves with three-lobed leaflets. The tiny solitary flowers each have five white petallike sepals only a few millimeters long. The center of the flower contains several thick white stamens topped with small yellow anthers and 3 to 5 styles.

References

External links
 Jepson Manual Treatment
 

stipitatum
Flora of California
Flora of Oregon
Flora of North America
Plants described in 1876
Flora without expected TNC conservation status